Pointless is a British television game show.

Pointless may also refer to:

 Pointless (Australian game show), the Australian adaption of Pointless
 "Pointless" (song), a 2022 single by Lewis Capaldi
 "Pointless", a 1983 song by Re-Flex from The Politics of Dancing
 "Pointless", a 1985 song by Dinosaur Jr. from Dinosaur
 "Pointless", a 1991 song by Prong from Prove You Wrong
 "Pointless", a 2007 single by The Brilliant Things
 Pointless, a 2014 comedy DVD by Dave Hughes
 "Pointless", a series 7 episode of the British sitcom Not Going Out (which features the game show)

See also
 Pointless topology, an approach to topology that avoids mentioning points
 Meaningless (disambiguation)
 Senseless (disambiguation)